Escharellidae is a family of bryozoans belonging to the order Cheilostomatida.

Genera:
 Bulbipora MacGillivray, 1895
 Lapralioides Kluge, 1962

References

Bryozoan families